The 1972 Northern Iowa Panthers football team represented the University of Northern Iowa as a member of the North Central Conference (NCC) during the 1972 NCAA College Division football season . Led by 13th-year head coach Stan Sheriff, the Panthers compiled an overall record of 4–5 with a mark of 3–4 in conference play, tying for fourth place in the NCC. Northern Iowa played home games at O. R. Latham Stadium in Cedar Falls, Iowa.

Schedule

References

Northern Iowa
Northern Iowa Panthers football seasons
Northern Iowa Panthers football